Barrie Beattie (born 6 December 1944) is a former Australian rules footballer who played for the Footscray Football Club in the Victorian Football League (VFL).

Notes

External links 
		

Living people
1944 births
Australian rules footballers from Victoria (Australia)
Western Bulldogs players
Wangaratta Rovers Football Club players